There are a few things named José Azueta:

Lt. José Azueta Abad of the Mexican Navy, slain in the 1914 United States occupation of Veracruz

Two municipalities named for him: 

José Azueta, Guerrero
José Azueta, Veracruz